Kaizaad Kotwal is an Indian producer, director, actor, writer and designer.  He has worked on over 200 theatre and film productions. He won an Emmy Award for Art Direction in 1996.

Currently he is a professor of theatre, media studies and film at Ohio State University in Columbus, Ohio. He won the Griffin Society Award for Best Professor in 2008 and in 2007 was named one of the top professors in Ohio.

He is the producer and director of the Indian production of The Vagina Monologues which has been running there since 2003.

He co-owns a production company called Poor-Box Productions with his mother Mahabanoo Mody-Kotwal. The company started in Ohio in 1996 and the Indian one was started in 1999 when they launched their production of Shirley Valentine.

Filmography

References

Ohio State University faculty
Living people
Parsi people
Year of birth missing (living people)